The following highways are numbered 937:

Costa Rica
 National Route 937

Ireland
 R937 regional road

United States